Morze  (More) is a village in the administrative district of Gmina Czyże, within Hajnówka County, Podlaskie Voivodeship, in north-eastern Poland.

Born 

 Viktar Svied — belarusian poet (1925—2020).

References

Villages in Hajnówka County